Dwarka Prasad Mishra (1901–1988) was an Indian politician, writer and journalist. He was a member of the Indian National Congress and served as the Chief Minister of Madhya Pradesh for two terms during the 1960s.
	
An Indian freedom fighter and diplomat, he was from Padari a village in Unnao. As a poet he composed the mahakavya, Krishnayana. He became the Chief Minister of Madhya Pradesh after Ravi Shankar Shukla.

Chief Minister

He served two terms as the chief minister of the state from 30 September 1963 to 8 March 1967 and 9 March 1967 to 29 July 1967.
He, along with Chandra Bhanu Gupta (Chief Minister of Uttar Pradesh) were instrumental in getting the power sharing formula between Indira Gandhi and Morarji Desai post the 1967 election. It gave the Deputy Prime Minister post to Desai, but the agreement broke down in 1969 and the Congress subsequently split.

Writings

His writings include:
Living an Era: India's March to Freedom (part one of memoirs, covering the period up to 1947)
The Nehru Epoch: From Democracy to Monocracy (part two of memoirs, critiquing the time from 1947 to 1964)
The Post Nehru Era: Political Memoirs (third and concluding part of memoirs, showing India in the post Nehru era up till the 1980s)
The search for Lanka (famous for proposing the thesis that Ramayana's Lanka was in Madhya Pradesh instead of Sri Lanka)

His memoirs became controversial as they included a letter from Vallabhbhai Patel to Mishra dated to July 1946 criticising Nehru for "Juvenile Mistakes". Congress members questioned authenticity of the letter as well as Mishra's motives and timing of revelation.

He was also active in the struggle for Indian independence and went to jail for the cause, for the first time aged 19 in 1920.

References

External links
 

1901 births
1988 deaths
Indian National Congress politicians from Madhya Pradesh
Indian independence activists from Madhya Pradesh
People from Unnao
Journalists from Madhya Pradesh
Chief Ministers of Madhya Pradesh
Leaders of the Opposition in Madhya Pradesh
Chief ministers from Indian National Congress
20th-century Indian journalists
20th-century Indian politicians
Indian political journalists